Twice as Tall is the fifth studio album by Nigerian singer Burna Boy. It was released on August 14, 2020, by Spaceship Entertainment, Bad Habit, Atlantic Records and Warner Music. Recording sessions took place in 2020, with Burna Boy, American singer and songwriter Diddy and Mama Burna Bose Ogulu serving as the record's executive producers. The album is a mixture of Afrobeats, Afrobeat, dancehall, pop and hip hop. It was produced primarily by Telz, along with production from Rexxie, Timbaland and DJDS, among others. The album features guest appearances from Youssou N'Dour, Naughty by Nature, Sauti Sol, Chris Martin and Stormzy. Its lead single is "Wonderful", released on June 26, 2020.

At the 63rd ceremony of the Grammy Awards, Twice as Tall won Best Global Music Album.

Background and recording
Burna Boy recorded songs for Twice as Tall mainly in [Ahoada], Nigeria over few months of the COVID-19 pandemic in 2020. Due to the pandemic, Burna Boy and his co-executive producer Diddy worked together through virtual file transfers and Zoom calls. The latter providing voice-over intros for a few of the songs and musical input. Burna Boy told The New York Times, "I've never picked up a pen and paper and written down a song in my life. It all just comes, like someone is standing there and telling me what to say. It's all according to the spirits. Some of us are put on this earth to do what we do". He said that through the album, he is building a bridge that leads every black person in the world to come together. Burna Boy said in a press release that the album is about a period of time in his life, "It's the album about the struggle for freedom. It's the album about life in general, real life, good times, bad times, happy times, sad times, great times". The album was produced primarily by Telz, along with production from Rexxie, Timbaland and DJDS, among others. It features guest appearances from Youssou N'Dour, Naughty by Nature, Sauti Sol, Chris Martin and Stormzy.

The album release was accompanied by a comic book The Secret Flame, narrated by Burna Boy's grandfather, Benson Idonije, who managed Afrobeat music pioneer Fela Kuti. The animated comic, follows Burna Boy through a spiritual journey of discovering oneself while highlighting the very moments that brought him to where he is standing tall today. Burna Boy released the album artwork on Instagram, depicting him in cartoon form as a titan, striding over modern roads and ancient monuments. He said that the art did justice to exactly what he intended to portray, noting that it reflects his journey through different energies and emotions while recording the album.

Composition
Twice as Tall is an Afrobeats, Afrobeat, dancehall, pop and hip hop album. The album opens with Youssou N'Dour-assisted "Level Up", where Burna Boy revisited his wild recent rise, celebrating his achievements and noted he is not getting so satisfied. Vulture.com writer Justin Curto praised the song, noting that it's better than a victory lap. "Alarm Clock" beat is a contemporary Afro-pop sound in outlook and is heavily influenced by Fela's Afrobeat era in delivery. It features a spoken intro from the executive producer Diddy. On "Way Too Big", Burna Boy is found in a self-confident form, relaying his intention to avoid bad company as subtle violin runs cushion his vocals. On "Bebo" produced by Rexxie, Burna Boy discussed his unwillingness to pretend.

"Wonderful" was produced by Telz and sees Burna Boy expressing excitement for his people and the globalization of their unique sound. It was recorded in Nigerian pidgin and Yoruba. In a review for Pitchfork, Mankaprr Conteh praised the song's production and said "the singer revels in the alchemy of rhythm and hustle. He's mystified by what beats and drums can conjure, the way they spread joy and spark motion from your toes to your scalp". "Onyeka" produced by Telz, is a happy and triumphant tune. In the Naughty by Nature-assisted track "Naughty by Nature", Burna Boy talked about the journey to where he is now, admitting his dislike for politics. "Comma" has a danceable beat. The LeriQ-produced track "No Fit Vex" sees Burna Boy dishing out positive twists, saying he is now a man who is less interested in his petulant side. "23", features a piano-assisted instrumental. Burna Boy sees himself similar to Basketball legend Michael Jordan. "Time Flies" interpolates Marc Anthony's "I Need You". It features vocals from Sauti Sol with a spoken outro from Burna Boy's mother Bose Ogulu. 

The politically charged Reggae-Fusion track "Monsters you Made" explores the historical injustices on an oppressed race that's convinced enough should be enough, addressing African and African-American experiences with prejudice, touching on subjects like slavery and miseducation. The song is full of pain, anger and plenty of defiances, featuring vocals from Chris Martin with a spoken outro from Ghanaian author and poet Ama Ata Aidoo. In "Wetin Dey Sup", Burna Boy speaks against gun violence and police brutality. The Stormzy-assisted track "Real Life" contains a sample of T-Pain's "I'm Sprung" and sees Stormzy crooning in true R&B style, with the aid of a vocoder. In "Bank On It", Burna Boy asks for forgiveness if he fumbles and for protection from his enemies. He is aided by his belief in a supreme being and deferred to faith in the face of a potential detraction. The song climaxed with a choir harmonizing the main hook.

Promotion
On February 21, 2020, Burna Boy announced he would embark on the Twice as Tall World tour beginning on May 7, 2020 in Atlanta, Georgia and ending on August 30, 2020 in Oberhausen, Germany. The tour ended up not happening due to the COVID-19 pandemic.

Singles
"Wonderful" was released as the album's lead single on June 26, 2020. The accompanying music video was released on June 30, 2020 and was directed by Director K; it depicts old African ways. In it, Burna Boy is seen lying asleep on a palm frond, somewhere in the land of warriors, kings and queens, he is then woken from his drowse by a gorilla and ambushed by some warriors dressed in traditional attire, before turning into a celebration where both the warriors and the singer began dancing. Burna Boy is dressed as a warrior and hailed a champion. Upon the release of the song, Burna Boy said "This song is about the wonders of seeing the impact of my music on people's lives as they shared their joy, pain and pleasure with me while I toured the world".

"Monsters You Made" was released as the album's second single on August 28, 2020. The accompanying music video, shows the theme of how systematic racism and inequality leads to trauma and violence.

"Real Life" was released as the album's third single on October 2, 2020. The accompanying music video, which was released on the same day, was directed by Meji Aladi and featured British rapper Stormzy. The video depicts the realities of crime.

Reception

Twice as Tall received generally favorable reviews from music critics. At Metacritic, which assigns a weighted average rating out of 100 to reviews from mainstream publications, this release received an average score of 79 based on 6 reviews. Pitchforks Mankaprr Conteh granted the album 8.0 out of 10 rating, describing it as massive and noting that "society could use a hero, a godsend". Motolani Alake of Pulse Nigeria assigned a rating of 8.7 out of 10, praising the singer's work ethic and stating that the album is amazing. Alake said the album is a "commendable and exceptional third straight album from the singer", while noting that "everything that made African Giant great is on Twice as Tall". Nicolas-Tyrell Scott of NME rated the album three stars out of five, characterizing it "as a satisfying sequel". He further said: "It's admirable to see him balance his signature sound with hints of exploration in collaborations such as "Monsters You Made", all while remaining true to his mother tongue". Writing for Meaww, Jenifer Gonsalves said the album is "a solid album from Burna Boy, one that establishes him as an artiste capable of blending sounds, styles and cultures to create music that encompasses a better world".

Lloyd Bradley of The Guardian awarded the album four stars out of five, noting that "the album positions African music in the 21st century by using contemporary sounds for traditional melodies and rhythms". The Daily Telegraphs Pritchard Will gave the album four stars out of five, saying "if Twice as Tall is the singer's bid for global superstardom, then the music is polished to befit his aims". In a review for Mail & Guardian, Kwanele Sosibo stated that "there's lots of sheen and polish on the album, with each song, it seems, staking its own fresh claim on the sonic palette that constitutes Afrobeats". Kunle Adesokan of Naijagig awarded the album a rating of 4.5 out of 5, noting that "if anything, Burna Boy has grown twice as tall from the man and artiste that recorded the African Giant album. Kunle added: "by using contemporary sounds for traditional melodies and drawing on various musical styles while staying true to African sounds, Burna Boy defines what modern African music should be."

Accolades

Track listing

Sample credits
 "Real Life" contains a sample of "I'm Sprung", performed by T-Pain.
 "Time Flies" contains an interpolation of "I Need You", performed by Marc Anthony.

Personnel

Vocalists
 Burna Boy – primary artist 
 Youssou N'Dour – featured artist 
 Naughty by Nature – featured artist 
 Sauti Sol – featured artist 
 Chris Martin – featured artist 
 Stormzy – featured artist 

Production

 Telz – production , co-production 
 Rexxie – production 
 Diddy – co-production 
 LeriQ – production , co-production 
 Timbaland – co-production 
 Mario Winans – co-production 
 Skread – production 
 JAE5 – production 
 Matt Testa – co-production 
 DJDS – co-production 
 Matthew Baus – co-production 
 P2J – co-production 
 Mike Dean – co-production 
 Sauti Sol – co-production 
 Andre Harris – co-production 

 Hassan Jokolo – co-production

Charts

Release history

References

2020 albums
Grammy Award for Best World Music Album
Burna Boy albums
Yoruba-language albums
Igbo-language albums